The Silver Arrow Mini-V (originally named the Micro-V) is a small reconnaissance UAV developed in Israel in the 1990s.

It is powered by twin 3 kW (4 horsepower) piston engines, one in a nacelle on each wing driving a pusher propeller. It has no landing gear. The Micro-V appears to be too small to carry a full sensor turret, carrying a miniaturized imager in a transparent section built into the middle of its fuselage.

Specifications

References

 Munson, Kenneth. "Unmanned Aerial Vehicles Directory: Part 1". Air International, July 1997, Vol 53 No 1. pp. 40–46.
 Manufacturer's website
 Jane's Unmanned Aerial Vehicles and Targets

This article contains material that originally came from the web article Unmanned Aerial Vehicles by Greg Goebel, which exists in the Public Domain.

1980s Israeli military reconnaissance aircraft
Elbit unmanned aerial vehicles
Twin-engined pusher aircraft
Aircraft first flown in 1989